Dr. Ramanathan V. Ramani  or Dr. RVR as he is known, is the founder and the managing trustee of Sankara Eye Foundation (SEF). Sankara Eye Hospital is a unit of SEF and is one of the country’s leading eye care service providers.

Early life and background
Ramani was born on 24 July 1947 in Coimbatore, Tamil Nadu to Dr. A Ramanathan and Lakshmi Ramanathan. He completed his high school education from Municipal Boys High School in Coimbatore. After highschool,  he went on to get his medical degree from Kasturba Medical College, where he was awarded the Best Outgoing Student. Ramani has stated that his father inspired him to pick up medicine. 
He was married in the year 1971 to Radha Ramani, who is also a doctor by profession.

Career
After graduation, Ramani and his wife Dr. Radha Ramani started a private practice and established a memorial clinic in the memory of his father Dr. A. Ramanathan. 
On 21 May 1974 Ramani started Sri Kanchi Kamakoti Medical Centre, a 100 square feet clinic in Coimbatore to provide subsidised health care to the poor at 50 paise per patient.
In 1978, Ramani, in association with the Rotary Club of Coimbatore and Sri Kanchi Kamakoti Medical Centre began the Measles Immunisation Programme.
By 1980, the clinic had gradually expanded and Sri Kanchi Kamakoti Medical Trust was formed in the year 1982 which led to the formation of Sankara Eye Foundation, India in the year 1985.
In 1980 Ramani joined the Rotary Club, Coimbatore Central, and became the president in 1989. He is an active Rotarian and a major donor.

In July 2019, the Ministry of Health approved the appointment of Dr Ramani to the Board of Governors of MCI as an additional Member.

Sankara Eye Foundation
Today Sankara Eye Foundation, India has successfully established 10 hospitals (Coimbatore, Krishnankoil, Guntur, Bangalore, Shimoga, Anand, RS Puram, Ludhiana, Kanpur, Jaipur) across 7 states all over the country under the 80:20 model (where 80 percent of the patients from rural parts of the country are treated for free, and the remaining 20 percent are the rich and the middle income sections of the society who indirectly contribute for those 80 percent’s Treatments by paying for themselves, thereby cross-subsidizing the free surgeries).
Ramani and his wife continue to serve Sankara Eye Foundation, India and provide their resources and expertise free of cost for the mission.

Awards and recognitions
•	Selected as a Group Study Exchange Team Member of Rotary International and visited US as "Goodwill Ambassador" in 1980.

•	Selected by Government of India as one of the 2 working group members in the non-governmental sector for Vision 2020 Program.

•	Rotary Club of Singapore’s Award for Humanitarian Service for "Gift of Vision" project in Cambodia in the Year February 1996.

•	Lifetime Achievement Award by Keyemsee Associates, Chennai Chapters in June 2000

•	Vaidya Ratna by Veda Vyasa Sabha Trust, Chennai in December 2000

•	Role Model of India Award by Basic Research and Development Society in December 2000

•	Dr. G. Venkatasamy Memorial Award by Community Ophthalmology Society of India in 2009

•	Netra Neta by the Coimbatore Citizens Council in May 2013

•	For the Sake of Honour Award by Rotary Club of Udumalpet in June 2013

•	Kochuouseph Chittilappilly Award - Nite of the Stars, Rotray Awards in June 2013

•	Life Time Achievement Award by Indian Medical Association, Coimbatore Branch in July 2014

•	Ruby Health Care Excellence Award by Shanmughananda Sabha Trust, Mumbai in March 2015

•      Padma Shri Award - A Civilian Award bestowed by Govt.of.India in March 2019

Received Bhagwan Mahaveer Award in Education in 2016.

References

1947 births
Living people
Founders of charities
People from Coimbatore